Cyperus centralis is a sedge of the family Cyperaceae that is native to arid areas of central Australia.

It is found in arid areas of the southern part of the Northern Territory, the northern part of South Australia and Western Australia. In Western Australia it is found in rocky gorges, around rock holes, in gullies and around stream beds the Mid West, Pilbara and Goldfields-Esperance regions where it is found in rocky gorges, in and around rock-holes and along stream banks growing in sandy soils.

It was first described in 1991 by Karen Wilson.  There are no synonyms.

See also
List of Cyperus species

References

External links 

 Cyperus centralis occurrence data from the Australasian Virtual Herbarium

Plants described in 1991
Flora of Western Australia
centralis
Taxa named by Karen Louise Wilson